Rang Mahal may refer to:

Rang Mahal, Sri Ganganagar, a collection of Kushan era archaeological cultural sites of India
Rang Mahal (Red Fort) or Palace of Colour, located in the Red Fort at Delhi in India
Rangmahal, a village in North Guwahati, Kamrup rural district of Assam state in India
Rang Mahal (TV series), a 2021 Pakistani romantic drama serial